The 2019 Dayton Flyers football team represented the University of Dayton in the 2019 NCAA Division I FCS football season. They were led by 12th-year head coach Rick Chamberlin and played their home games at Welcome Stadium. They competed as a member of the Pioneer Football League. The Flyers finished the season 8–3, 6–2 in PFL play to finish in a tie for second place.

Previous season

The Flyers finished the 2018 season 6–5, 5–3 in PFL play to finish in a tie for fourth place.

Preseason

Preseason coaches' poll
The Pioneer League released their preseason coaches' poll on July 30, 2019. The Flyers were picked to finish in second place.

Preseason All-PFL teams
The Flyers had eight players selected to the preseason all–PFL teams.

Offense

First team

Tucker Yinger – RB

Ben Gauthier – OL

Second team

Adam Trautman – TE

Defense

First team

Nick Surges – DL

Andrew Lutgens – LB

David Leisring – DB

Special teams

First team

Sean Smith – P

Matt Tunnacliffe – LS

Schedule

Game summaries

at Indiana State

at Robert Morris

Duquesne

Jacksonville

at Valparaiso

at Stetson

San Diego

at Morehead State

Marist

at Drake

Butler

Players drafted into the NFL

References

Dayton
Dayton Flyers football seasons
Dayton Flyers football